James Cogan may refer to:

James Cogan, namesake of James Cogan House
James Cogan, fictional character in Haven (TV series)